Valhall is an anglicized form of Old Norse Valhǫll, an afterlife "hall of the slain" in Norse mythology, which is more commonly anglicized as Valhalla. Otherwise, Valhall may refer to:

Valhall (band), a Norwegian band
Valhall oil field, a Norwegian oil field

See also
Valhalla
Walhalla (disambiguation)